This is a list of military conflicts in which Hungarian armed forces participated in or took place on the historical territory of Hungary.

The list gives the name, the date, the Hungarian allies and enemies, and the result of these conflicts following this legend:

Middle Ages

Wars under the Árpád dynasty's rule

Wars between 1301 and 1526

Wars between 1526 and 1699

Wars between 1700 and 1900

Wars in the 20th century

Wars in the 21st century

See also 
 Military history of Hungary

References

Sources 

Hungary
 
 
Wars
Wars
 
 
Sieges involving Hungary